Gancho Peev (born 14 March 1947) is a former Bulgarian footballer who played as a defender. He is legendary player of Lokomotiv Plovdiv and have 327 appearances and 1 goal in A PFG for the club. Gancho Peev is also "Sportsman №1 of Bulgaria" for 1978 and "Master of Sports" since 1976. Peev is a vice-champion of Bulgaria for 1973, with two more bronze medals won - in 1969 and 1974. He has played 11 games in the UEFA Cup for Lokomotiv Plovdiv.

He has played in 1 game for the national team of Bulgaria in 1973.

References

1947 births
Living people
Bulgarian footballers
Association football goalkeepers
OFC Sliven 2000 players
PFC Lokomotiv Plovdiv players
First Professional Football League (Bulgaria) players